Agh Darak (also Romanized as Āgh Darak; also known as Āq Darak) is a village in Kolah Boz-e Gharbi Rural District, in the Central District of Meyaneh County, East Azerbaijan Province, Iran. At the 2006 census, its population was 86, in 18 families.

References 

Populated places in Meyaneh County